Thomas E. O'Donnell is a judge of the Irish Circuit Court since 2011. Prior to his appointment, he was a judge of the Irish District Court from 1998.

Born in Limerick of a distinguished legal family he was educated at Crescent College, Limerick and at Mungret College, Limerick. He studied law at University College Dublin and was enrolled as a solicitor in 1976. He was assigned as judge of the District Court for Limerick City in 1999, where he was "highly regarded".  In 2014, he was assigned as the sole Judge for the South Western circuit, which includes the counties of Limerick, Clare and Kerry, and in part coincides geographically with the old Munster Circuit described by Maurice Healy. Judge O'Donnell has three sons. His second son, Mark O'Donnell, represented the Qatar International Rugby team in the 2016 West Asian Division 3 Championship, having qualified under the three year residency rule.

References

External links
Irish Courts Service
University College Dublin

Living people
Lawyers from Limerick (city)
Circuit Court (Ireland) judges
Alumni of University College Dublin
1954 births
People educated at Crescent College